Castlewellan railway station was on the Great Northern Railway (Ireland). It was located in the village of Castlewellan.

History

The station was opened by the Great Northern Railway (Ireland) on 24 March 1906 with the opening of its line to Banbridge, and the opening of the Belfast and County Down Railway line from Newcastle.

The BCDR's line from Belfast (Queen's Quay) to Newcastle via Downpatrick closed on 16 January 1950, but the GNR continued to operate services from Banbridge to Newcastle via Castlewellan until final closure of the line on 2 May 1955.

The site today 
Since the mid-2000s the site has been used as an industrial estate consisting of three blocks of light industrial units.

References 

 
 
 

Disused railway stations in County Down
Railway stations opened in 1906
Railway stations closed in 1955
1906 establishments in Ireland
1955 disestablishments in Northern Ireland
Railway stations in Northern Ireland opened in the 20th century